A surcingle belt is a belt having a web body with leather fittings on either end and a frame style metal buckle. The web is usually a heavy wool twill and may be solid colored or longitudinally striped, or embroidered with a repeating motif. The leather ends are sewn onto this, and are generally narrowed. 

Surcingle belts are conventionally considered an element of casual dress. They are strongly associated with the preppy subculture.

Belts (clothing)